The 2007 NCAA Division I Indoor Track and Field Championships was the 43rd NCAA Men's Division I Indoor Track and Field Championships and the 26th NCAA Women's Division I Indoor Track and Field Championships, held at the Randal Tyson Track Center in Fayetteville, Arkansas near the campus of the host school, the University of Arkansas. In total, thirty-two different men's and women's indoor track and field events were contested from March 9 to March 10, 2007.

Team Scores
 Note: Top 10 only
 Scoring: 10 points for a 1st-place finish in an event, 8 points for 2nd, 6 points for 3rd, 5 points for 4th, 4 points for 5th, 3 points for 6th, 2points for 7th, and 1 point for 8th.
 Full results

Men's teams

Women's teams

Results

Men's results

60 meters

200 meters

400 meters

800 meters

Mile

3000 meters

5000 meters

60 meters hurdles

High jump

Pole vault

Long jump

Triple jump

Shot put

Weight throw

Women's results

w60 meters

w200 meters

w400 meters

w800 meters

wMile

w3000 meters

w5000 meters

w60 meters hurdles

wHigh jump

wPole vault

wLong jump

wTriple jump

wShot put

wWeight throw

See also
 NCAA Men's Division I Indoor Track and Field Championships 
 NCAA Women's Division I Indoor Track and Field Championships

References
 

NCAA Indoor Track and Field Championships
NCAA Division I Indoor Track and Field Championships
NCAA Division I Indoor Track and Field Championships
NCAA Division I Indoor Track and Field Championships